The Facsimile project is a 3D, discrete-event simulation library that can be used for industrial simulation projects in an engineering and/or manufacturing environment.

Facsimile simulations run on the Java Virtual Machine under Linux, Mac OS, BSD, Unix and Microsoft's Windows.

Facsimile is open-source/free software and is distributed under version 3 of the GNU Lesser General Public License (LGPLv3).

After a fairly lengthy hiatus, commencing around 2008, Facsimile development is once more active, as of November 2012.

External links
 
 Facsimile development hosted on GitHub

Free simulation software
Free computer libraries